The portrayals of fictional prime ministers of the United Kingdom have been either completely fictional figures, or composite figures based on real-life people, or real-life figures who have never been prime minister other than in fiction.

List of fictional prime ministers
Real people on this list are marked:

See also
 List of fictional political parties
 List of fictional presidents of the United States
 List of fictional British monarchs
 List of fictional Australian politicians

References

Prime Ministers, British
 
Prime Ministers
Fictional